The Senior men's race at the 2008 IAAF World Cross Country Championships was held at the Holyrood Park in Edinburgh, United Kingdom, on March 30, 2008.  Reports of the event were given in The New York Times, in the Herald, and for the IAAF.

Complete results for individuals, and for teams were published.

Race results

Senior men's race (12 km)

Individual

†: Fathi Meftah from  finished 35th in 36:44 min, but was disqualified because of doping violations.

Teams

Note: Athletes in parentheses did not score for the team result.

Participation
According to an unofficial count, 179 athletes from 45 countries participated in the Senior men's race. This is in agreement with the official numbers as published.

 (8)
 (1)
 (8)
 (1)
 (5)
 (1)
 (6)
 (6)
 (1)
 (1)
 (9)
 (3)
 (1)
 (1)
 (8)
 (9)
 (1)
 (1)
 (1)
 (7)
 (4)
 (8)
 (1)
 (9)
 (1)
 (1)
 (2)
 (1)
 (1)
 (9)
 (1)
 (1)
 (8)
 (9)
 (1)
 (1)
 (3)
 (9)
 (1)
 (1)
 (8)
 (1)
 (9)
 (9)
 (1)

See also
 2008 IAAF World Cross Country Championships – Junior men's race
 2008 IAAF World Cross Country Championships – Senior women's race
 2008 IAAF World Cross Country Championships – Junior women's race

References

Senior men's race at the World Athletics Cross Country Championships
IAAF World Cross Country Championships